The 1919 Kentucky Wildcats football team represented the University of Kentucky as a member of the Southern Intercollegiate Athletic Association (SIAA) during the 1919 college football season. Led by Thomas Andrew Gill in his second and final season as head coach, the Wildcats compiled an overall record of 3–4–1 with a mark of 3–1–1 in SIAA play.

Schedule

References

Kentucky
Kentucky Wildcats football seasons
Kentucky Wildcats football